Josué Abraham Quijano Potosme (born March 10, 1991) is a Nicaraguan professional defender who plays for Real Estelí and the Nicaragua national team.

Club career
Quijano joined Walter Ferretti from hometown club CaRuNa RL.

Motorcycle accident
In summer 2013 he needed to be hospitalized after breaking his knee in an accident with his motorcycle also involving teammate Milton Busto. He was expected to return to playing football in six months.

International career
Quijano made his debut for Nicaragua in a January 2011 Copa Centroamericana match against El Salvador and has, as of June 2019, earned a total of 61 caps, scoring 1 goal. He has represented his country in 4 FIFA World Cup qualification matches and played at the 2011 and 2013 Copa Centroamericana.

International goals
Scores and results list Nicaragua's goal tally first.

References

External links
 
 Profile - FENIFUT

1991 births
Living people
People from Masaya Department
Association football defenders
Nicaraguan men's footballers
Nicaragua international footballers
C.D. Walter Ferretti players
2011 Copa Centroamericana players
2013 Copa Centroamericana players
2014 Copa Centroamericana players
2017 Copa Centroamericana players
2017 CONCACAF Gold Cup players
2019 CONCACAF Gold Cup players